These are the matches that Atalanta have played in European football competitions.

Matches
Atalanta's score listed first.

European Cup Winners' Cup

UEFA Cup / UEFA Europa League

UEFA Champions League

Overall record

By competition 
Accurate as of 14 April 2022

Source: UEFA.comPld = Matches played; W = Matches won; D = Matches drawn; L = Matches lost; GF = Goals for; GA = Goals against; GD = Goal Difference.

By country

Key

As of match played 14 April 2022

By club
As of 14 April 2022
Key

References

Atalanta B.C.
Italian football clubs in international competitions